Polypogon is a nearly cosmopolitan genus of plants in the grass family, commonly known beard grass or rabbitsfoot grass.

Description

Polypogon species vary in appearance; some are erect, while others drape over the ground in waves. Many have soft, fluffy inflorescences that look like rabbit's foot amulets.

Some are introduced species established outside their native ranges. Some of those are considered invasive species and noxious weeds, most notably Polypogon monspeliensis, the annual beard grass.

 Species
 Polypogon × adscendens Guss. - Italy
 Polypogon australis Brongn. - Argentina, Chile incl Juan Fernández Islands
 Polypogon chilensis (Kunth) Pilg.  - Argentina, Chile incl Juan Fernández Islands, Paraguay, Uruguay, Peru, Brazil
 Polypogon elongatus Kunth - USA (CA AZ CO TX), much of Mesoamerica + South America
 Polypogon exasperatus (Trin.) Renvoize - Argentina, Chile, Paraguay, Uruguay, Peru, Ecuador, Bolivia, Colombia, southern Brazil
 Polypogon fugax Nees ex Steud. - China, Japan, Korea, central + southwestern Asia, Ethiopia, Somalia
 Polypogon griquensis (Stapf) Gibbs Russ. & Fish - Namibia, South Africa
 Polypogon hissaricus (Roshev.) Bor - Xinjiang, Central Asia, Pakistan, Iran, Himalayas
 Polypogon imberbis (Phil.) Johow - Argentina, Chile incl Juan Fernández Islands, Uruguay, southern Brazil
 Polypogon interruptus Kunth - British Columbia, western United States (WA to CA + TX), Mexico, south America
 Polypogon ivanovae Tzvelev - Xinjiang 
 Polypogon linearis Trin. - Chile
 Polypogon maritimus Willd. - wetlands in Asia, Mediterranean
 Polypogon mollis (Thouars) C.E.Hubb. & E.W.Groves - Tristan da Cunha
 Polypogon monspeliensis (L.) Desf. - Africa, Eurasia; widely naturalized in North America
 Polypogon nilgiricus Kabeer & V.J.Nair - India
 Polypogon parvulus Roseng., B.R.Arrill. & Izag. - Uruguay, Argentina
 Polypogon pygmeus Tzvelev  - Afghanistan
 Polypogon schimperianus (Hochst. ex Steud.) Cope - from Ethiopia + Saudi Arabia to Zimbabwe
 Polypogon tenellus R.Br. - South Australia, Western Australia
 Polypogon tenuis Brongn. - Ascension Island, St. Helena, Namibia, Cape Province
 Polypogon viridis (Gouan) Breistr. - central + southwestern Asia, Mediterranean

 Formerly included
Numerous species now regarded as better suited to other genera: Agrostis Alopecurus Brachypodium Chaetium Chaetopogon Gymnopogon Muhlenbergia Pentameris Reynaudia Triniochloa

Phytoremediation
Polypogon monspeliensis was investigated for its mercury-accumulating properties as a phytoremediation plant. A U.S. NIS—National Institutes of Health funded study showed the plant to take up 110 times more mercury (HgS) than control plant species. This mercury hyperaccumulator sequesters the toxin in its roots in an insoluble form, reducing exposure to ecological receptors in situ and in erosion sediments.

References

External links
 Jepson Manual Treatment — Polypogon
 USDA Plants Profile: Polypogon (rabbitsfoot grass)
 Polypogon. Grass Manual on the Web.

 
Poaceae genera
Phytoremediation plants
Grasses of Africa
Grasses of Asia
Grasses of Europe
Grasses of North America
Grasses of Oceania
Grasses of South America